Derek Miller may refer to:

Derek Miller (Canadian musician)
Derek Miller (field hockey)
Derek Miller of Sleigh Bells (band)
Derek E. Miller, Assistant Prosecutor in Macomb County
Derek B. Miller, American novelist